Bishop McGann-Mercy Diocesan High School (formerly Mercy High School) was a Roman Catholic high school in Riverhead, New York on Long Island.   It was operated by the Roman Catholic Diocese of Rockville Centre. The Diocese closed the school in 2018.

History
Founded by the Sisters of Mercy in 1956, five sisters were sent from their Brooklyn convent to create and staff a co-educational high school on the East End of Long Island to be named Mercy High School. In the first year of operation, there were 47 students, using excess classrooms of the nearby St. John the Evangelist parish. In October 1962, a new building was dedicated by Bishop Walter Kellenberg of the newly formed Diocese of Rockville Centre which still serves as the present building. In 1992, it was decided that a junior high school was to be added to the already ninth through twelfth grades. In 2002, the Diocese of Rockville Centre and the Sisters of Mercy created a partnership to better enhance the needs of the school. In September 2003, the school's name officially changed to Bishop McGann-Mercy Diocesan High School, after Bishop John McGann, the Diocese's longtime leader, and the Sisters of Mercy signifying the partnership. The school's numbers swelled over the course of the next five years, following a time when some thought the school might close. The Diocese takeover saved the school from debt. Mr. Carl Semmler was the school's principal at that time. However, the school went on to close at the end of the 2018 school year. Deacon John Hogan served as the school's last principal during the 2017–2018 school year. Mr. Charles Bender continued on as the Dean of Students until the school's closure. Lisa Navarra served as the school's Assistant Principal until the school's closure, and was a former teacher at St. John the Baptist Diocesan High School. On March 12, 2018, the Diocese of Rockville Centre announced the school would close at the end of the 2017–2018 school year.

Performing arts
Bishop McGann-Mercy Diocesan High School's theatre department was recognized by the Teeny Awards on an annual basis in recent years, both for performances by student actors and the innovation of the director, Bob Kelly. Recent productions by the theatre department include The Music Man and The Diary of Anne Frank.  The school's choral department was also highly praised, with the chamber choir having performed at Avery Fisher Hall in Lincoln Center in 2013, and Carnegie Hall in 2014.

External links
Official site
ShopForMercy.com
SectionXI.org (Athletics)

Notes and references

Catholic secondary schools in New York (state)
Riverhead (town), New York
Educational institutions established in 1956
Roman Catholic Diocese of Rockville Centre
Schools in Suffolk County, New York
Private middle schools in New York (state)
1956 establishments in New York (state)
Sisters of Mercy schools